Cornulețe are Romanian and Moldovan pastries aromatised with vanilla or rum extract/essence, as well as lemon rind, and stuffed with Turkish delight, jam, chocolate, cinnamon sugar, walnuts, and/or raisins, with the shape representing a crescent. They are traditionally eaten during Romanian holidays, especially during Christmas time, or other special occasions.

See also
 List of pastries

Notes and references

External links
 Cornulețe recipe
 Romanian Cornulețe (recipe in english)
 Vanilla Crescents (Romanian Cornulete) With Marmalade

Romanian pastries
Moldovan cuisine
Stuffed desserts
Christmas food